Wang Hsiao-hua (29 June 1922 – 11 March 2005) was a Chinese politician. She was among the first group of women elected to the Legislative Yuan in 1948.

Biography
She then worked as a researcher in the Faculty of Education at the University of Tokyo. Returning to China, she became chair of the women's section of the Xing'an branch of the Kuomintang and served as a councillor in the Xing'an provincial government.

Wang was a delegate to the 1946  that drew up the constitution of the Republic of China. In the 1948 elections for the Legislative Yuan, she was a Kuomintang candidate in Xing'an, and was elected to parliament. She relocated to Taiwan during the Chinese Civil War,

She died in March 2005.

References

1922 births
Nara Women's University alumni
Academic staff of the University of Tokyo
20th-century Chinese women politicians
Members of the Kuomintang
Members of the 1st Legislative Yuan
Members of the 1st Legislative Yuan in Taiwan
2005 deaths
Chinese expatriates in Japan